Cesar was born in Buenos Aires, Argentina, at the age of 7 he moved with his family to Madrid, Spain where he studied until university. Cesar has a Degree in Law and Business Administration and a master's degree in Human and professional leadership, private law. After working 4 years as a legal consultant he decided to leave everything to pursue acting fully, his passion since he was a child. He studied and the Cristina Rota Academy and Bul 2120 in Madrid and completed the full conservatory at Stella Adler Academy of Acting Los Angeles.

Credits:“Manifesto” by Camila Varela (presented at Cannes Film Festival 2015); “Paloma” by Jean Lee (AFI Workshop women directors) y “Somewhere” by Laura Gutierrez.

Theater Credits:  “Misalliance” (John Tarleton, Dir: Susan Vinciotti Bonito), “Our Lady of 121st Street” (Balthazar, Dir. Bonnie McNeil), “45 Seconds From Broadway” (Charles, Dir. Milton Justice) and “Six Degrees of Separation” (Eddie the Doorman, Dir. Milton Justice).

He recently finished shooting the movie Pecado Original. The cast of these movie is full integrated by Maia Nikiphoroff, Cesar Di Bello, Alejandro Torres Menchaca, Licia Alonso and the Paraguayan actor Tomás Pérez. Paraguayan national artist Cacho Falcon also participated and collaborated on the film.

References

Spanish male film actors
Living people
Male actors from Buenos Aires
Year of birth missing (living people)